Grania is a genus of marine annelid worms in the class Clitellata. They are found at many depths in sands throughout the world.

Species
There are 72 species in the genus Grania which have been identified. They include:
Grania acanthochaeta Rota & Erséus, 1996
Grania algida Rota & Erséus, 1996
Grania alliata Coates & Stacey, 1993
Grania americana Kennedy, 1966
Grania angustinasus Rota & Erséus, 1996
Grania antarctica Rota & Erséus, 1996
Grania aquitana Rota & Erseus, 2003
Grania ascophora Coates, 1990
Grania atlantica Coates & Erséus, 1985
Grania bekkouchei Prantoni, De Wit & Erséus, 2016 
Grania bermudensis Erséus & Lasserre, 1976

Grania brasiliensis Prantoni, De Wit & Erséus, 2016
Grania breviductus De Wit, Rota & Erséus, 2009
Grania bykane Coates, 1990
Grania canaria Rota & Erseus, 2003
Grania capensis Prantoni, De Wit & Erséus, 2016 
Grania carchinii Rota & Erséus, 1996
Grania carolinensis Prantoni, De Wit & Erséus, 2016 
Grania cinctura De Wit & Erséus, 2007
Grania chilensis Prantoni, De Wit & Erséus, 2016 
Grania colorata De Wit, Rota & Erséus, 2009
Grania conjuncta Coates & Stacey, 1993
Grania crassiducta Coates, 1990
Grania curta De Wit & Erséus, 2007
Grania cryptica Prantoni, De Wit & Erséus, 2016 
Grania darwinensis  Coates & Stacey, 1997)
Grania dolichura Rota & Erséus, 2000
Grania ersei Coates, 1990
Grania euristila Coates & Stacey, 1997
Grania fiscellata De Wit & Erséus, 2007
Grania fortunata Rota & Erseus, 2003
Grania fustata De Wit & Erséus, 2007
Grania galbina De Wit & Erséus, 2007
Grania hastula Coates, 1990
Grania hinojosai Prantoni, De Wit & Erséus, 2016 
Grania hirsuticauda Rota & Erséus, 1996
Grania homochaeta De Wit, Rota & Erséus, 2009
Grania hongkongensis Erséus, 1990
Grania hylae Locke & Coates, 1999
Grania hyperoadenia Coates, 1990
Grania incerta Coates & Erséus, 1980
Grania inermis Erséus, 1990
Grania integra Coates & Stacey, 1997
Grania lasserrei Rota & Erséus, 1997
Grania laxarta Locke & Coates, 1999
Grania levis Coates, 1985
Grania longiducta Erséus & Lasserre, 1976
Grania longistyla Coates & Stacey, 1993
Grania macrochaeta  Pierantoni, 1901)
Grania mangeri  Michaelsen, 1914)
Grania maricola Southern, 1913
Grania mauretanica Rota & Erseus, 2003
Grania mira Locke & Coates, 1998
Grania monochaeta  Michaelsen, 1888)
Grania monospermatheca Erséus & Lasserre, 1976
Grania novacaledonia De Wit & Erséus, 2007
Grania ocarina Rota, Erséus & Wang, 2003
Grania occulta De Wit & Erséus, 2010
Grania ovitheca Erséus, 1977
Grania pacifica Shurova, 1979
Grania papillata De Wit & Erséus, 2007
Grania papillinasus Rota & Erseus, 2003
Grania parvitheca Erséus, 1980
Grania paucispina  Eisen, 1904)
Grania postclitellochaeta  Knöllner, 1935)
Grania principissae  Michaelsen, 1907)
Grania pusilla Erséus, 1974
Grania quaerens Rota, Wang & Erséus, 2007
Grania reducta Coates, 1985
Grania regina De Wit, Rota & Erséus, 2009
Grania roscoffensis Lasserre, 1967
Grania simonae Prantoni, De Wit & Erséus, 2016 
Grania sperantia Rota, Wang & Erséus, 2007
Grania stephensoniana Rota & Erséus, 1997
Grania stilifera Erséus, 1990
Grania tasmaniae Rota & Erséus, 2000
Grania torosa Rota & Erseus, 2003
Grania trichaeta Jamieson, 1977
Grania unitheca Prantoni, De Wit & Erséus, 2016 
Grania vacivasa Coates & Stacey, 1993
Grania variochaeta Erséus & Lasserre, 1976
Grania vikinga Rota & Erseus, 2003

References

Enchytraeidae